Trevor Lloyd Grizzle (born December 25, 1947) is a Jamaican academic and professor of New Testament Studies at Oral Roberts University.

Personal life
Trevor Grizzle was born in Jamaica on December 25, 1947. He converted to Christianity in 1964 in England. He was ordained in 1968 and was a missionary in Ghana.

He earned his B.A. at Lee University in 1975, his M.Div. at Southwestern Baptist Theological Seminary in 1978, and his Ph.D. at Southwestern Baptist Theological Seminary in 1984.

Contributions
Grizzle's capacity as professor at the charismatic Oral Roberts University clearly links him with the charismatic movement. He also disseminates his charismatic scholarship to lay audiences, such as at church conferences. His scholarly contribution to the field of Christian pneumatology is evident in his publications, for example: Church Aflame and his contributions to The Spirit-filled Life Bible. Another way in which his expertise is evident in his endorsements of publications oriented on the charismatic expression of Christianity. Grizzle, furthermore, serves on the editorial board of Reconciliation, The Official Journal of the Pentecostal/Charismatic Churches of North America (PCCNA). In short, Grizzle earned a reputation as a notable academic within the charismatic Christianity.

Besides Grizzle's contributions in the field of pneumatology, he is also actively involved in the ongoing debate on racial and cultural division in religion.
He assumed the position of New Testament and Greek in the Graduate School of Theology and Missions at Oral Roberts University in 1982…. Conjointly with teaching at ORU, he has served as Associate Pastor of Care Fellowship Church of God in Tulsa for six years, but presently (in addition to teaching full-time) pastors Hope International Ministries, which he founded in March 2002.

Teaching Awards
In 1991 and 1998, respectively, Dr. Grizzle was voted Outstanding Faculty of the Year by both the faculty and student body of the School of Theology, and nominated ORU Scholar of the Year in 2001.

Ministry
In 1968, he received ministerial credentials from the Church of God (Cleveland, TN). He embarked upon full-time missionary service in Ghana, West Africa, conjointly with teaching at ORU. He has served as Associate Pastor of Care Fellowship Church of God in Tulsa for six years, but presently (in addition to teaching full-time) pastors Hope International Ministries, which he founded in March 2002.

Works

Thesis

Books

Edited by

References

1947 births
Living people
Christian writers
Jamaican academics
Lee University alumni
New Testament scholars
Oral Roberts University faculty
Southwestern Baptist Theological Seminary alumni